The 2017 Copa do Brasil Second Round was played from 22 February to 8 March 2017, to decide the 20 teams advancing to the Third Round. In this year, this round was decided in a single match. In case of tie, the qualified team was determined by penalty shoot-out.

Matches

|}

Match 41

Match 42

Match 43

Match 44

Match 45

Match 46

Match 47

Match 48

Match 49

Match 50

Match 51

Match 52

Match 53

Match 54

Match 55

Match 56

Match 57

Match 58

Match 59

Match 60

Notes

References

2017 Copa do Brasil